The following is a list of the 119 communes of the Bouches-du-Rhône department of France.

The communes cooperate in the following intercommunalities (as of 2020):
Métropole d'Aix-Marseille-Provence (partly)
Communauté d'agglomération Arles-Crau-Camargue-Montagnette
Communauté d'agglomération Terre de Provence
Communauté de communes Vallée des Baux-Alpilles

References

Bouches-du-Rhone